Juan Enguera (died 1513) was the Grand Inquisitor of the Crown of Aragon from 1507 to 1513.

Biography
Juan Enguera was born in Valencia in the fifteenth century.  A member of the Dominican Order, Enguera rose to become a confessor of Ferdinand II of Aragon.

Enguera was appointed Bishop of Vic on 19 December 1505.  He was later appointed Bishop of Lleida on 9 December 1510, and then Bishop of Tortosa on 1 October 1512.  In addition to his duties as a bishop, he was the Grand Inquisitor of the Crown of Aragon from 1507 to 1513.

Enguera died in Valladolid on 14 February 1513.

References

This page is based on this page on Spanish Wikipedia.
Profile from catholic-hierarchy.org

External links and additional sources
 (for Chronology of Bishops) 
 (for Chronology of Bishops) 

1513 deaths
15th-century Aragonese Roman Catholic priests
Inquisitors
16th-century Roman Catholic bishops in Spain
Spanish Dominicans
Year of birth unknown
Bishops of Vic
Bishops of Lleida
Dominican bishops